Humbert Achamer-Pifrader (21 November 1900 – 25 April 1945) was an Austrian jurist, who was member of the SS of Nazi Germany. He was commander of Einsatzgruppe A from September 1942 to September 1943.

Biography
Achamer-Pifrader was born in Teplitz-Schönau. His mother was Elisabeth Pifrader.  Achamer-Pifrader fought on the Italian Front in World War I as a one-year volunteer. He was positioned by Otto Steinhäusl in the police headquarters in Salzburg in 1926, and transferred to the civil service after two years of military and technical training. In addition to his professional activities, he began to study law and political science at the University of Innsbruck and received his doctorate of law there on 7 July 1934.

Achamer-Pifrader joined the Austrian Nazi Party on 10 November 1931 (membership number 614,104). In June 1935, he fled to the German Reich because of the Nazi ban in Austria, where he entered the service of the Bavarian Political Police immediately. In early September 1935, he joined the SS (membership number 275,750) and rose steadily in this Nazi organization. In April 1936, he was transferred to the Gestapo in Berlin, where he worked on "Austrian affairs".

After the beginning of the Second World War, Achamer-Pifrader was head of the Gestapo in Darmstadt. He was promoted to SS-Standartenführer in 1941.  From July 1942 he was Chief of the Sicherheitspolizei (SiPo; Security Police) and SD headquartered in Wiesbaden.  In September 1942 he became, in succession to Franz Walter Stahlecker and Heinz Jost, commander of Einsatzgruppe A, which was responsible for the mass murder of (mostly Jewish) civilians. In addition, he was commander of the Security Police in Riga for some time.

Achamer-Pifrader was promoted to SS-Oberführer on 1 January 1943, and on 31 August 1943, awarded with the Iron Cross 2nd Class and also the War Merit Cross, 1st class. In 1944 he returned to the Reich Security Main Office in Berlin and took over as Chief of Security Police in the field units of the Unit IV B.

On 25 April 1945, he died in an air raid on Linz.

Achamer-Pifrader married Maria Hauser (born 1906 in Salzburg) in 1929, with whom he had three children.

References

Literature 
 Helmut Krausnick / Hans-Heinrich Wilhelm: Die Truppe des Weltanschauungskrieges, DVA, Stuttgart 1981 .

External links
 Biography

1900 births
1945 deaths
SS-Oberführer
Einsatzgruppen personnel
Gestapo personnel
Holocaust perpetrators
Austrian Nazi lawyers
Reich Security Main Office personnel
University of Innsbruck alumni
Austro-Hungarian military personnel of World War I
People from Teplice
Sudeten German people
Deaths by airstrike during World War II